The fourteenth season of American Dad! aired on TBS from November 7, 2016, to September 11, 2017. On August 27, 2015, TBS renewed the series for a fifteenth season. 

Guest stars for the season include Jemaine Clement, Jennifer Coolidge, Rosie O'Donnell, Walton Goggins, Wiz Khalifa, Alfred Molina, Andy Richter, Susan Sarandon, Rick Steves, Bear Grylls, Phil Keoghan, and Corey Stoll.


Episode list

References

2016 American television seasons
2017 American television seasons
American Dad! (season 14) episodes